gara bilagh (also Romanized as garabilagh) is a village in Kaghazkonan-e Markazi Rural District, Kaghazkonan District, Meyaneh County, East Azerbaijan Province, Iran. At the 2006 local census, its population was 76, in 26 families.

References 

Populated places in Meyaneh County